Jafarabad  is a town located in the Nagar District of Gilgit-Baltistan, Pakistan.

See also
 Former State of Hunza
 Baltit Fort
 Altit Fort
 Northern Areas
 Karakoram Highway
 Karakoram Mountains
 Nagar Valley
 Burusho
 Ganish Village
 Hunza Valley
 Karimabad
 Khizerabad
 Aliabad
 Nasirabad
 Hussainabad
 Murtazaabad
 Ahmedabad
 Sikandarabad
 Hunza–Nagar District

Hunza-Nagar District